Mildred Pitts Walter (born September 9, 1922) is an American children's book writer, known for her works featuring African-American protagonists. Walter has written over 20 books for young readers, including fiction and nonfiction. Several of her books have won or been named to the honor list of the Coretta Scott King Awards. A native of Louisiana who later moved to Denver, Walter was inducted into the Colorado Women's Hall of Fame in 1996. She published her autobiography, Something Inside So Strong: Life in Pursuit of Choice, Courage, and Change, in 2019.

Biography 
Mildred Pitts was born on September 9, 1922, the youngest of seven children to Paul Pitts, a log cutter, and Mary Pitts, a beautician and midwife. She was born in Sweetville, Louisiana, and raised in nearby Gaytine, both small, segregated sawmill communities in Beauregard Parish, Louisiana
near the city of DeRidder.

Walter earned a bachelor's degree in English from Southern University at New Orleans. She earned money for tuition by working in the defence industry during World War II. In 1944, following graduation, Walter moved to Los Angeles and worked as a school clerk. She completed certification requirements in elementary education at California State College.

In Los Angeles, she met her husband, Earl Walter, to whom she was married from 1947 until his death in 1965. Both Mildred and Earl were active in civil rights activism as members of the Congress of Racial Equity (CORE), of which Earl eventually became national vice chairman. They had two sons.

Walter moved to Denver, Colorado, in 1970. She earned a master's degree in education from the Antioch College extension in Denver. Walter worked as a consultant at Western Interstate Commission of Higher Education in Denver, and as a consultant teacher and lecturer at Metro State College in Denver. She turned 100 in 2022.

Writing 
Walter began writing when she realized there were few books for young readers about Black children, written by Black authors. Since the publication of her first book in 1969 (Lillie of Watts, about a girl growing up in the Watts neighborhood of Los Angeles), Walter has published over 20 books for children. Lillie of Watts was followed by a sequel, Lillie of Watts Takes a Giant Step (1971). Walter's other works of fiction include Ty's One-Man Band (1980), Justin and the Best Biscuits in the World (1986), and Mariah Loves Rock (1988).

Walter's nonfiction works include Mississippi Challenge (1992), which describes the history of African Americans in Mississippi from slavery, through the Civil War, Reconstruction, and civil rights activists' efforts to overturn racist voting laws in the state. Publishers Weekly wrote that "Walter's heavily footnoted text may prove somewhat slow going for the general reader, but she has uncovered much eye-opening material." Kirkus called it a "compelling account," and a "sobering message about the real cost of democracy."

Walter's 2011 historical fiction novel, The Second Daughter: The Story of a Slave Girl, is based on the true story of Mum Bett, a former slave who successfully sued for her freedom.

In a 2019 article in The Lion and the Unicorn, Karen Chandler calls The Second Daughter (along with Joyce Hansen's novels that foreground young Black protagonists) "just as relevant, arguably, as they were when they first fifteen or twenty years ago." She adds that these books "offer a much-needed antidote to a U.S. popular culture that conveys the assumption that white persons' actions, beliefs, and values are standard."

The University Press of Mississippi published Walter's autobiography, Something Inside So Strong: Life in Pursuit of Choice, Courage, and Change, in 2019.

Awards and honors 
Walter was inducted into the Colorado Women's Hall of Fame in 1996. Her books have earned the following prizes:

 Coretta Scott King Award Winner: Justin and the Best Biscuits in the World (1986)
 Coretta Scott King Award Honors: Because We Are (1983); Trouble's Child (1985); Mississippi Challenge (1992)
 Jane Addams Children's Book Award Honors: Second Daughter: The Story of a Slave Girl (1996)

Selected works

Children's fiction 
 Ty's One-Man Band (1980) 
 My Mama Needs Me (1983) 
 Because We Are (1983) 
Brother to the Wind (1985) 
 Justin and the Best Biscuits in the World (1986) 
 Second Daughter: The Story of a Slave Girl (1996)

Children's nonfiction 
 Mississippi Challenge (1992) 
 Kwanzaa: A Family Affair (1995)

Autobiography 
 Something Inside So Strong: Life in Pursuit of Choice, Courage, and Change (2019)

References 

Living people
1922 births
20th-century American writers
20th-century American women writers
21st-century American writers
21st-century American women writers
American children's writers
African-American children's writers
20th-century African-American women writers
20th-century African-American writers
21st-century African-American women writers
21st-century African-American writers
American centenarians
African-American centenarians
Women centenarians